The Wonder Woman is a 2020 Taiwanese romantic comedy television series. It stars Aviis Zhong, Wes Lo, Jack Lee and Lan Zhang as the main cast. It was first broadcast on 2 February 2020. The drama was filmed as it aired. Production wrapped on 24 May 2020 and the celebratory banquet was held on 26 May 2020.

Behind-the-scenes clips were aired on Vidol under the name "Shark Bites".

Plot
An ace in the world of marketing, Du Ai Sha has spent her entire career fighting her way to the top. Setting her eyes on the goals ahead, she is known for her fierce tenacity and unwavering determination. Never allowing herself to be sidetracked by anything that might come her way, Ai Sha uses whatever means necessary to get the job done.

Working alongside Ai Sha is Yi Feiyang, another marketing whiz who always has an answer to every problem and has an uncanny ability to gain the advantage, no matter the situation. Completely different in their approaches to work and life, Ai Sha and Feiyang have developed a fierce workplace rivalry, as they each strive to be the best in the business.

But when trouble stirs, Ai Sha and Feiyang are forced to work together, using their combined talents to overcome the obstacles ahead. Realizing they make a pretty good team, the two opponents begin to see each other in a whole new light.

Cast

Main cast
Aviis Zhong as Du Ai-sha
Wes Lo as Yi Fei-yang
Jack Lee as Ye Xuan
Lan Zhang as Tang Xiao-an

Supporting cast
Gabriel Lan as Qi Zhen-kai
Demi Yin as Wen Jing-jing
Cui Pei-yi as Fang Hua
Heaven Hai as Ms May
Wu Bi-lian as Ms Zhen Zhen / Jennifer
Huang Jian-hao as Du Nan-cheng
Chen Jia-yang as Du Dong-xue
Amanda Liu as Vicky
Rita Feng as Yuki
Ckay as Steven
Yen Hao as Liao Xi-jun
Xiao Dong-yi as Ni-mo
Yu Cheng-xin as Ah-jiong
Liao Wei-bo as Ah Ben
Emmie Ries as Marguerite
Lu Wei-zhen as Sui-lin

Soundtrack
"Disguise 為你變成他" by Tarcy Su 
"Where Are My Jeans? 少了一件牛仔褲" by Janice Yan
"True Colours 真面目" by Tarcy Su
"Freefall 跪了" by GBOYSWAG ft Julia Wu

"Let's Be Together 最想見到你" by Ann
"If You Say You Love Me 如果你說愛我" by F.I.R.
"One Decade as One Day 十年如一日" by Yisa Yu
"Not Anymore... 不讓你再" by Boon Hui Lu

Broadcast

Ratings
Competing dramas on rival channels airing at the same time slot were:
CTV - Someday Or One Day, In Time With You (re-run), Attention, Love! (re-run)
CTS - I, Myself
FTV - The Mirror

 Numbers in  denote the highest rating and numbers in  denote the lowest rating for the drama's tenure.
 Ratings are obtained from AGB Nielsen.

References

External links
 (SETTV)
 (TTV)

Sanlih E-Television original programming
Taiwanese drama television series
2020 Taiwanese television series debuts
2020 Taiwanese television series endings
Taiwanese romance television series
Taiwan Television original programming